The Khumbu Icefall is located at the head of the Khumbu Glacier and the foot of the Western Cwm, which lies at an elevation of  on the Nepali slopes of Mount Everest, not far above Base Camp and southwest of the summit. The icefall is considered one of the most dangerous stages of the South Col route to Everest's summit.

Overview

The Khumbu Glacier moves an estimated  down the flank of Mt. Everest every day. Ice entering the fall takes approximately 4.3 years to emerge at the base which is 2,000 vertical feet lower and one linear mile away. The speed of ice flow and the precipitous elevation drop, creates a bergschrund (ice berg shoulder) characterized at the top by massive transverse blocks that calve off the upper glacier creating gaping crevasses (hundreds of feet deep and often over 50 feet wide). As these massive initial glacial segments descend the fall, they are slowly twisted and crushed by the churning pressure of glacial flow, generating increasingly tortuous crevasse fields in the middle of the fall, and a chaotic maze of smaller blocks toward the bottom of the fall. 

Due to constant glacial motion, snow bridges concealing crevasses, and overhanging ice blocks (called seracs) ranging in size from several tons to thousands of tons, can open or collapse with little warning generating extreme danger for climbers. A climber caught in an avalanche or other "movement event" in the icefall can do very little to avoid injury, because the topography of the fall zone prevents fast evasive action. Crossing the Khumbu Icefall is so dangerous that even extensive rope and ladder networks installed by professional guides cannot prevent loss of life. 

The official Himalayan Database records 44 deaths in the Icefall between 1953 to 2016. No deaths have been recorded between 2017 and 2021.

Prudent climbers place emphasis on avalanche and crevasse-fall survival and rescue techniques prior to entering this terrain.  Most climbers try to pass through the ice fall before sunrise when it is usually more immobile due to freezing in the nighttime cold. As sunlight warms the area, ice-melt causes friction within the structure to decline, which increases the rate of flow and hence, crevasse opening and ice-block or serac collapse. The most dangerous time to cross the fall is generally mid-to-late afternoon. Experienced, acclimatized climbers can ascend the icefall in a few hours, while inexperienced or non-altitude-acclimatized climbers may take 10–12 hours to complete the passage. "Camp I" on Everest's South Col route is typically slightly beyond the top of the Khumbu Icefall.

2014 avalanche 

Around 6:30 am local time on 18 April 2014, 16 Nepalese climbers were killed by an avalanche in the Khumbu Icefall. Only 13 bodies were recovered. Nine others sustained blunt trauma injuries. The climbers were preparing the route through the dangerous icefall for the spring climbing season when the avalanche engulfed them.

References 

Glaciers of Nepal
Mount Everest